ISO 3166-2:ER is the entry for Eritrea in ISO 3166-2, part of the ISO 3166 standard published by the International Organization for Standardization (ISO), which defines codes for the names of the principal subdivisions (e.g., provinces or states) of all countries coded in ISO 3166-1.

Currently for Eritrea, ISO 3166-2 codes are defined for 6 regions.

Each code consists of two parts, separated by a hyphen. The second part is two letters.

Current codes
Subdivision names are listed as in the ISO 3166-2 standard published by the ISO 3166 Maintenance Agency (ISO 3166/MA).

ISO 639-1 codes are used to represent subdivision names in the following administrative languages:
 (ar): Arabic
 (ti): Tigrinya

Click on the button in the header to sort each column.

 Notes

Changes
The following changes to the entry have been announced in newsletters by the ISO 3166/MA since the first publication of ISO 3166-2 in 1998:

Codes before Newsletter I-1

See also
 Subdivisions of Eritrea
 FIPS region codes of Eritrea

External links
 ISO Online Browsing Platform: ER
 Regions of Eritrea, Statoids.com

2:ER
ISO 3166-2
Eritrea geography-related lists